Maldaha Dakshin Lok Sabha constituency (spelling as spelled by Election Commission of India) is one of the 543 parliamentary constituencies in Malda district, West Bengal, India.

While five of the assembly segments of No. 8 Maldaha Dakshin Lok Sabha constituency are in Malda district  in West Bengal, two assembly segments are in Murshidabad district. As per order of the Delimitation Commission in respect of the delimitation of constituencies in the West Bengal, Malda Lok Sabha constituency ceased to exist from 2009 and two new ones came into being: Maldaha Uttar Lok Sabha constituency and  Maldaha Dakshin Lok Sabha constituency.

Assembly segments

Maldaha Dakshin Lok Sabha constituency (parliamentary constituency no. 8) is composed of the following assembly segments:

Members of Parliament

Election results

General election 2019
Source:Source

General election 2014

General election 2009

See also
 List of Constituencies of the Lok Sabha

References

Lok Sabha constituencies in West Bengal
Politics of Malda district
Maldah